My Driver Sweet Lover is the first ever teleserye that is aired in the  Philippines by TV5 and starred by JC de Vera, Danita Paner and Arci Muñoz and was directed by Eric Quizon and Soxie Topacio.

Plot
Rocky (JC de Vera) is a jeepney driver whose charm and street smart background often leave all the girls hooked, except for his usual enemy, Gabrielle (Danita Paner), a cranky and workaholic hotel heiress. The history of fighting cat and dog began in an orphanage—a young Rocky was abandoned by his father; while Gabrielle was an obese, lost squire who was brought there after an attempted kidnap to steal her inheritance. But when Gabrielle was accidentally reunited with her family, the two had lost contact until they crossed paths at present. Separated by fate, their gap grows wider through an intense dislike and a yawning divide brought by class and money. The cunning Monique (Arci Muñoz) makes Gabrielle's life even more difficult as she pulls everything to steal Rocky from her.

Cast

Main cast
JC de Vera as Rocky
Danita Paner as Gabrielle "Gaby" Barrinuevo
Arci Muñoz as Monique

Supporting cast
Richard Gomez as Delfin/Akmhedd Alfaruk

Pamilya Barrinuevo
Pilita Corrales as Maximiliana "Abuela Maxi" Barrinuevo
Dina Bonnevie as Araceli Barrinuevo
Eric Quizon as Aaron Barrinuevo

Pamilya at mga kaibigan ni Rocky
Eddie Gutierrez as Lolo George
Nova Villa as Aling White
Ramon Christopher as Mang Tisoy
BJ Forbes as Bert Ngisi
Meg Imperial as Millet
Chris Pasturan as Asyong Afro
Mura as Boy Baldado

Ang mga Devoted Servants sa Barrinuevo Mansion
Ruby Rodriguez as Yaya Tabs
Epi Quizon as Jimrod
Yayo Aguila as Yaya Auring

Friends and Loved ones ni Gaby
Keempee de Leon as Von
Tom Rodriguez as Simon/Ricky
Carla Humphries as Coleen
Alyanna Asistio as Trisha
JR de Guzman as Ned
Cai Cortez as Minnie
Krystel Goodwin as France

Extended cast
Carmi Martin as Ms. Horinda
Liza Lorena as Helga Solis (Aracelli's Mother)
Eva Darren as Sor Aguida
Chelsea Eugenio as Bea/young Gaby
Julius Gareza as Randy/young Rocky 
Joko Diaz as Agent Castro 
Vince Izon as Hector
Joaqui Tupaz as Procopio
Mon Confiado as Cyrus Delo Tavo

References

External links

See also
List of programs broadcast by The 5 Network
List of programs aired by The 5 Network

TV5 (Philippine TV network) drama series
2010 Philippine television series debuts
2011 Philippine television series endings
Philippine drama television series
Filipino-language television shows